The cabinet of Esko Aho was the 65th government of Finland. The cabinet existed from 26 April 1991 to 13 April 1995. The cabinet’s Prime Minister was Esko Aho.

The Aho Government started its term when Finland was in the midst of its history’s worst economic downfall and a banking crisis. In 1991, the failed coup in Moscow ended the Soviet Union and the Aho cabinet terminated the Agreement of Friendship, Cooperation, and Mutual Assistance.

Finland joined the European Union in 1995 following the 1994 referendum. The Christian League left the Government because they opposed Finland’s membership in the European Union.

Ministers

References

Aho
1991 establishments in Finland
1995 disestablishments in Finland
Cabinets established in 1991
Cabinets disestablished in 1995